Zoltank (stylized as ZOLTANK) is the second studio album by Japanese Darkwave duo, Aural Vampire, but their first released through a major record label. The song from the album, "69 Balloons", was used as the theme song to the film "The OneChanbara".

Track listing

Personnel 
Exo-Chika – vocals
Raveman – production, lyrics

Reception

Charts

External links
Official Website

References

2010 albums
Japanese-language albums